Egomania is the psychological condition of an egomaniac.

Egomania or Egomaniac may also refer to:
Egomania (film)
Egomaniacs (album), a 1993 album by Kim Fahy, Jamie Harley and Kramer
Egomania (Love Songs), a 1997 album by Cobra Verde
 Egomaniac (album), a 2016 album by Kongos
"Egomaniac", a song by Human League from the album, Credo

See also
Egotism
Egoism